Systems science is the interdisciplinary field of science surrounding systems theory, cybernetics, the science of complex systems. It aims to develop interdisciplinary foundations, which are applicable in a variety of areas, such as engineering, biology, medicine and social sciences. Systems science and systemics are names for all research related to systems theory. It is defined as an emerging branch of science that studies holistic systems and tries to develop logical, mathematical, engineering and philosophical paradigms and frameworks in which physical, technological, biological, social, cognitive and metaphysical systems can be studied and developed.

This list of systems sciences organizations gives an overview of global and local organizations in the field of systems science. This list shows all kinds of organizations and institutes listed thematically.

Awards 
 Richard E. Bellman Control Heritage Award
 George B. Dantzig Prize
 Donald P. Eckman Award
 IEEE Simon Ramo Medal: award for exceptional achievement in systems engineering and systems science
 John von Neumann Theory Prize
 Rufus Oldenburger Medal
 A. M. Turing Award
 UKSS Gold Medallists by the United Kingdom Systems Society
 The Hellenic Society for Systemic Studies Medal

Research centers

General

America 
 Center for Complex Systems and Brain Sciences: a multi-disciplinary center in Florida Atlantic University founded in 1985
 International Institute for General Systems Studies (IIGSS): an American non-profit scholastic organization for studies and education in Systems science in Pennsylvania, USA
 International Systems Institute (ISI): a non-profit, public benefit scientific and educational corporation in Carmel, California, USA
 MIT Institute for Data, Systems and Society (IDSS): MIT research institute dedicated to analyzing complex, high-impact systems in society and to applying analytical methods to address complex social challenges
 Mental Research Institute: a center for systems theory and psychotherapy located in Palo Alto, California, USA
 New England Complex Systems Institute (NECSI): an independent educational and research institution dedicated to advancing the study of complex systems
 Santa Fe Institute (SFI): a non-profit research institute dedicated to the study of complex systems in Santa Fe, New Mexico, founded in 1984
 The Center for Systems Science and Engineering (CSSE) at JHU: (CSSE) is a research collective housed within the Department of Civil and Systems Engineering (CaSE) at Johns Hopkins University (JHU) in Baltimore, MD, USA

Europe 

 Institut für Unternehmenskybernetik, Germany
 Institute for Complex Systems Simulation, University of Southampton, UK
 International Institute for Applied Systems Analysis (IIASA): an international non-governmental research organization located in Laxenburg, near Vienna, in Austria
 Institute for Biocomputation and Physics of Complex Systems, Spain
 Max Planck Institute for Dynamics of Complex Technical Systems, Germany
 Max Planck Institute for Dynamics and Self-Organization, Germany

Australia 
 CSIRO Centre for Complex Systems Science
 ARC Centre for Complex Systems (ACCS)
 Centre for Complex Systems, The University of Sydney

Asia 
 Center of Excellence in Systems Science, IIT Jodhpur

Systems biology 
 Department of Systems Biology
 Institute for Systems Biology
 Max Planck Institute for Biological Cybernetics

Systems ecology 
 ETH Zurich, Terrestrial Systems Ecology
 University of Amsterdam, Systems Ecology Department
 University of Florida, Systems Ecology program
 State University of New York College of Environmental Science and Forestry, Systems Ecology Lab
 Stockholm University, Systems Ecology Department

Systems engineering

United States 
 GTRI Electronic Systems Laboratory (ELSYS) at the Georgia Tech Research Institute, Atlanta, Georgia, USA
 GTRI Aerospace, Transportation and Advanced Systems Laboratory at the Georgia Tech Research Institute, Atlanta, Georgia, USA
 Western Transportation Institute at Montana State University, Montana, USA

Europe 
 Hasso Plattner Institute related to the University of Potsdam, Germany
 University of Reading Business School: Informatics Research Centre, Reading, Berkshire, England, UK
 École Polytechnique Fédérale de Lausanne: I2S – Institut d'ingénierie des systèmes in Lausanne, Switzerland
 University of the West of England CEMS, Systems Engineering Estimation and Decision Support (SEED) Bristol, England, UK
 University of Bristol, Systems Centre, Bristol, England, UK
 Technical University of Hamburg, Hamburg, Germany
 Mullard Space Science Laboratory: UCL Centre for Systems Engineering (UCLse), the London, England, UK
 Research Centre for Automatic Control (CRAN), joint research unit with Nancy-Université and CNRS, Nancy, France

Educational

Europe 
 Bristol Centre for Complexity Sciences, UK
 Institute for Complex Systems Simulation, University of Southampton, UK

Australia 
 The University of Sydney offers a Master of Complex Systems

Societies

World wide 
 IEEE Systems, Man, and Cybernetics Society (IEEE SMCS)
 International Council on Systems Engineering (INCOSE)
 International Federation for Systems Research (IFSR)
 International Society for the Systems Sciences (ISSS)
 World Organisation of Systems and Cybernetics (WOSC)
 IEEE Systems Council
 Complex Systems Society (CSS)
 The International Academy for Systems and Cybernetic Sciences, an honor society initially created by the IFSR

America 
 American Society for Cybernetics
 Asociacion Mexicana de Systemas y Cibernetica
 Grupo de Estudio de Sistemas Integrados (GESI) (Study Group of Integrated Systems), Argentina
 Instituto Andino de Sistemas (IAS), Peru
 International Systems Institute (USA), California, San Francisco
 Los Alamos National Laboratory
 System Dynamics Society: a non-profit organization for further research into system dynamics and systems thinking based in Albany, New York, USA

Asia 
 International Society of Knowledge and Systems Science (ISKSS), Japan
 Japan Association for Social and Economic Systems Studies (JASESS)
 Korean Society for Systems Science Research, Korea
 Systems Engineering Society of China

Australia 
 Australia and New Zealand Systems Group (ANZSYS)
 COSNet: An Australian-based network for Complex Open Systems research

Europe 
 Association Francaise d'Ingénierie Système (French association for Systems Engineering), France
 Associazione Italiana per la Ricerca (AIR) (Italian Research Society)
 Associazione Italiana per la Ricerca sui Sistemi (AIRS) (Italian Systems Research Society)
 Bulgarian Society for Systems Research (BSSR), Bulgaria
 Centre for Hyperincursion and Anticipation in Ordered Systems (CHAOS)
 Croatian Interdisciplinary Society: a non-governmental organization for interdisciplinary education and research in complex systems in Croatia
 Cybernetics Society, London, UK
 Dutch Systems Group of Systemsgroep Nederland, The Netherlands
 Evolution, Complexity and Cognition group, University of Brussels, Belgium
 Hellenic Society for Systemic Studies (HSSS) Ελληνική Εταρεία Συστημικών Μελετών
 Gesellschaft für Wirtschaft und Sozial-Kybernetik e. V. (GWS), Germany
 Learned Society of Praxiology, Poland
 MSSI - Management Science Society of Ireland
 Österreichische Studiengesellschaft für Kybernetik (OSGK)(Austrian Society for Cybernetic Studies), Austria
 Polish Systems Society, Poland
 Slovenian Society for Systems Research (SDSR)
 Sociedad Española de Systemas Generales, Spain
 United Kingdom Systems Society, UK

See also 
 List of journals in systems science
 List of information systems journals
 List of systems engineering at universities
 List of systems engineers
 List of systems scientists

References